"Dead Man's Party" is the second episode of the third season of the television show Buffy the Vampire Slayer. It was written by Marti Noxon, directed by James Whitmore, Jr., and first broadcast on October 6, 1998.

Buffy struggles with life back in Sunnydale. Her problems with Angel, combined with the anger and distance of her friends and mother, only make things more difficult. However, everyone is eventually brought back together when a Nigerian mask that Joyce has acquired causes an army of zombies to rise up all over Sunnydale.

Plot 
Joyce hangs up a Nigerian mask given by a gallery friend. At Giles' apartment, Buffy avoids most questions about her summer, while Giles hides his relief at her return.

The next day, Joyce takes Buffy to see Principal Snyder, who takes vindictive pleasure in refusing to lift her expulsion. Buffy meets Pat, a member of Joyce's book club, who comments on Buffy's recent behavior and its impact on Joyce. Buffy finds a dead cat in the basement and buries it in the garden. That night, the Nigerian mask's eyes glow red and the reanimated cat crawls out of the earth.

The return of the cat shocks Buffy and Joyce; Giles arrives to collect it for study. He notices the mask before having to remind Buffy that she is not allowed on school grounds. At school, Buffy's friends decide to throw her a party. The discussion distracts Giles from a page showing the Nigerian mask.

Overwhelmed by the noisy party, Buffy tries in vain to talk to Willow. She overhears Joyce telling Pat how tough Buffy's return has been on her. Combined with the coldness of her friends and the problems with school, Buffy decides it was a mistake to have come home and starts packing.

At the library, Giles is horrified by what he learns about the mask. He tries to call Buffy, but party-goers fail to relay the message. Driving to Buffy's house, Giles hits a man in the road, gets out of the car and finds the man reanimated. Giles barely escapes as bodies rise all over Sunnydale and are inexorably drawn to Joyce's mask.

Willow finds Buffy packing to leave and starts berating her for all the pain and worry she caused, explaining that she and the rest of the Scoobies had tough things to deal with as well. Buffy and Joyce argue in the midst of the party, and Xander sides with Joyce against Buffy, while Oz tries to break it up. As the argument grows heated, the revenants crash through the windows and doors, causing the Scoobies to immediately stop arguing and band together to combat the threat. Several guests are killed. In the bedroom, Willow checks Pat's pulse and finds she is dead.

Giles tells Oz and Cordelia about the mask containing the powers of the zombie demon Ovu Mobani, which means "Evil Eye". Pat reanimates as a zombie and puts the mask on and becomes the demon incarnate. Buffy plunges a shovel into Pat's eyes, causing her to vanish along with all the other zombies. The anger that Joyce and the other Scoobies felt towards Buffy dissipates.

The next day, Giles tries to convince Snyder to let Buffy return. When he refuses, Giles applies a little intimidation. In the coffee shop, Willow tells Buffy about her experiences dabbling in witchcraft. Buffy apologizes for not being there to support her, and Willow forgives her.

Reception

Rhonda Wilcox and David Lavery described "Dead Man's Party", in which Buffy attempts to reconnect with her mother and friends, as "one of the most uncomfortable episodes of the series". They wrote that the zombies represent the group's "failed attempts to bury their anger" at Buffy, and that they only achieve a partial catharsis by fighting alongside her. They quote Xander who says "you can't just bury stuff, Buffy, it will come right back to get you".

References

External links 

 

Buffy the Vampire Slayer (season 3) episodes
1998 American television episodes
Television episodes about zombies
Television episodes written by Marti Noxon